Elizabeth St Clare Sharman (born 8 August 1957, in Bolton), sometimes known as Liz Sharman, is a former British slalom and sprint canoeist who competed from the late 1970s to the late 1980s. She won six medals at the ICF Canoe Slalom World Championships with two golds (K-1: 1983, 1987), three silvers (K-1: 1979; K-1 team: 1981, 1983) and a bronze (K-1 team: 1985).

Sharman also competed in sprint canoeing in the K-2 500 m event at the 1988 Summer Olympics in Seoul, but was eliminated in the semifinals.

Sharman was awarded a Member of the Most Excellent Order of the British Empire (MBE) by Queen Elizabeth II on 13 December 1989.

References

1957 births
English female canoeists
Canoeists at the 1988 Summer Olympics
Living people
Olympic canoeists of Great Britain
British female canoeists
Sportspeople from Bolton
Medalists at the ICF Canoe Slalom World Championships